Adelina Akhmetova (Cyrillic: Аделина Ахметова; born 25 December 1998) is a Kazakhstani athlete specialising in the 400 metres hurdles. She represented her country in the 4 × 400 metres relay at the 2018 World Indoor Championships without reaching the final.

International competitions

Personal bests
Outdoors
400 metres – 56.39 (Almaty 2017)
400 metres hurdles – 57.92 (Doha 2019)
Indoors
400 metres – 56.22 (Ust-Kamenogorsk 2018)

References

1998 births
Living people
Sportspeople from Karaganda
Kazakhstani female sprinters
Kazakhstani female hurdlers
Asian Games competitors for Kazakhstan
Athletes (track and field) at the 2018 Asian Games
Competitors at the 2019 Summer Universiade
Asian Indoor Athletics Championships winners
21st-century Kazakhstani women